Neeme is a village in Jõelähtme Parish, Harju County in northern Estonia.

References

Villages in Harju County